Inspirações da Tarde is a Portuguese language novel by Brazilian author, Bernardo Guimarães. It was first published in 1858.

References

Brazilian novels
Portuguese-language novels
1858 novels
Novels by Bernardo Guimarães